Mykki is the first studio album by American rapper Mykki Blanco. It was released via Dogfood Music Group and Studio !K7 on September 16, 2016. The production is handled by Woodkid and Jeremiah Meece. Music videos were created for "High School Never Ends" and "Loner".

Critical reception

At Metacritic, which assigns a weighted average score out of 100 to reviews from mainstream critics, Mykki received an average score of 77, based on 14 reviews, indicating "generally favorable reviews".

Stacey Anderson of Pitchfork gave the album a 7.7 out of 10 and stated that "Mykkis whirlwind of topics have a heated musicality to match, jostling backpack rap with spongy neo-soul, usually with a chant-along pop chorus twining it all together." Benjamin Aspray of Slant Magazine gave the album 4.5 stars out of 5, writing, "Mykki is abundantly entertaining—a seedy, playful camp melodrama produced and performed with the unblinking conviction of an overdue star." Benjamin Boles of Now gave the album 4 stars out of 5, describing it as "an outsider rap album that hits hard enough to cross over to a much bigger audience than many would have predicted."

MusicOMH placed it at number 30 on the "Top 50 Albums of 2016" list.

Track listing

Personnel
Credits adapted from liner notes.

 Mykki Blanco – vocals
 Jean Deaux – vocals (2)
 Jeremiah Meece – vocals (7), production (1, 2, 4, 6–8, 10, 12, 13)
 Woodkid – production (3, 5, 9, 11)
 Bruno Bertoli – arrangement (3, 5, 9, 11)
 Matt Lambert – photography

References

External links
 

2016 debut albums
Mykki Blanco albums
Studio !K7 albums